Etienne Schneider (born 29 January 1971) is a Luxembourgish politician and economist of the Luxembourg Socialist Workers' Party (LSAP). He was a municipal councillor in Kayl from 1995 to 2005, and from 1997 to 2004, he was secretary general of the parliamentary group of the LSAP in Parliament. He was elected first alderman of the municipality of Kayl in 2005, a mandate he held until May 2010. Schneider was appointed Minister of the Economy and Foreign Trade on 1 February 2012. In the government formed following the 2013 Luxembourg general election he is Deputy Prime Minister and Minister of the Economy. He continued to hold these offices following the 2018 Luxembourg general election, where he became the health minister too. From 2013 to 2018, he served as Minister for Defence. Following the 2018 Luxembourg general election, he became the first openly gay politician to be reelected for the office of deputy minister. After stepping down as first deputy prime minister on 4 February 2020, he entered the business world on the board of directors of both ArcelorMittal and the Vladimir Yevtushenkov and Yevgeny Novitsky associated Russian firm Sistema.

Early life
Born in Dudelange, Schneider completed his secondary schooling at the Lycée Technique d'Esch-sur-Alzette before studying at the ICHEC Brussels Management School and at the University of Greenwich in London where he graduated in business and finance in 1995.

Political posts
In 1995, Schneider became a councilor in Kayl, a post he maintained until 2005, subsequently becoming first alderman until 2010. In 1997, he was appointed secretary general of the Luxembourg Socialist Workers' Party (LSAP) until he became chairman of the board of the electricity utility  Cegedel, subsequently becoming chairman and Managing Director of the German energy company, Enovos (a grid company), the creation of which is also credited to him. Schneider was also a research assistant at the European Parliament in Brussels between 1995 and 1996. In the Kayl municipal elections in 2005 he was elected as first alderman of the municipality which post he occupied till May 2010. During 1997, he worked in Brussels as a project leader with NATO. In 2010, he also became chairman and managing director of Luxembourg's Société Nationale de Crédit et d'Investissement but resigned all his business appointments when he became Minister of the Economy and Foreign Trade in February 2012, replacing Jeannot Krecké. In this capacity he also co-chaired the Superior Committee for Research and Innovation. His tasks as minister involved private sector research and implementation of the bill of 5 June 2009 relating to assistance in the field of research.

Following the legislative elections of 20 October 2013, Étienne Schneider was appointed Deputy Prime Minister, Minister of the Economy, Minister of Internal Security and Minister of Defence on 4 December 2013 in the coalition government formed by the Democratic Party (DP), the LSAP and the Green Party (déi gréng).

After the legislative elections of 14 October 2018, Étienne Schneider was appointed Deputy Prime Minister, Minister of the Economy and Minister of Health on 5 December 2018 in the coalition government formed by the DP, the LSAP and déi gréng.

As Minister of Economy Schneider has expressed his support for the space program currently taking place to mine near-Earth asteroids in a statement, also mentioning the environmental benefits for mining off Earth.

He continued to hold these offices following the 2018 Luxembourg general election, where he became the health minister too. From 2013 to 2018, he served as Minister for Defence. Following the 2018 Luxembourg general election, he became the first openly gay politician to be reelected for the office of deputy minister.

Business career
On 4 February 2020, Schneider stepped down from his post as Minister of Economy and entered the business world receiving an appointment as a director at ArcelorMittal in June 2020 after Jeannot Krecké had resigned his position which Krecke held for ten years at ArcelorMittal. On 30 April 2020 as the sole shareholder, Schneider established his first anonymous limited firm SA Beta Aquarii which is named after the brightest star in the constellation associated with Schneider's astrological sign Aquarius and is located on Boulevard de la Pétrusse in Luxembourg.  On 27 June 2020 following Jeannot Krecké's appointment to Sistema in May 2012, Schneider became an independent director of Sistema which controls East-West United Bank (Luxembourg).

Personal
He is openly gay, and married his husband Jérôme Domange in 2016.

See also
 Bettel-Schneider Ministry (2013 – )

Notes

References

External links

Biography at the Luxembourg government website

1971 births
Gay politicians
Deputy Prime Ministers of Luxembourg
Government ministers of Luxembourg
Living people
Luxembourg Socialist Workers' Party politicians
Luxembourgian economists
People from Dudelange
Luxembourgian LGBT politicians
21st-century Luxembourgian politicians
20th-century Luxembourgian politicians
20th-century economists
21st-century economists
Ministers for Defence of Luxembourg